Pectinivalva planetis is a moth of the family Nepticulidae. It is found along the southeastern coast of New South Wales.

The wingspan is about 5.5 mm for females.

The host plant is unknown, but probably a Myrtaceae species. They probably mine the leaves of their host plant.

External links
Australian Faunal Directory
Australian Nepticulidae (Lepidoptera): Redescription of the named species

Moths of Australia
Nepticulidae
Moths described in 1906
Taxa named by Edward Meyrick